Denis Istomin was the defending champion but decided not to participate.
Dmitry Tursunov won the title, defeating Adrian Mannarino 6–4, 7–6(7–5) in the final.

Seeds

Draw

Finals

Top half

Bottom half

References
 Main Draw
 Qualifying Draw

American Express - TED Open - Singles
2012 Singles